Moustapha Alassane's Cinema of Possibilities is a 2009 documentary film.

Synopsis 
Moustapha Alassane is a living legend in African cinema. His adventures take us to the era of "pre-cinema", to the times of magical lantern and Chinese shadows. He is the first director of Nigerien cinema and animation films in Africa. He tells very old stories with current technology, but he also narrates the most current events with the most archaic means. This documentary not only tells the adventure of a human being and an extraordinary professional, but the memories of a generation, the history of a country, Niger in its golden age of cinema.

References 

2009 films
French documentary films
2009 documentary films
Documentary films about film directors and producers
Documentary films about African cinema
Documentary films about animation
2000s French films